Anhimella is a genus of moths of the family Noctuidae.

Species
 Anhimella contrahens (Walker, 1860)
 Anhimella pacifica McDunnough, 1943
 Anhimella perbrunnea (Grote, 1879)

References
 Anhimella at Markku Savela's Lepidoptera and Some Other Life Forms
 Natural History Museum Lepidoptera genus database

Hadeninae
Noctuoidea genera